Wola Osowińska  is a village in the administrative district of Gmina Borki, within Radzyń Podlaski County, Lublin Voivodeship, in eastern Poland.

The village has a population of 1110.

Notable people
 Zdzisław Krasnodębski, fighter pilot

References

Villages in Radzyń Podlaski County